Nicholas Luke Harrison (born 3 February 1992 in Bath, Somerset) is an English cricketer active in 2013 who plays for Worcestershire. He has appeared in three first-class matches as a right handed batsman who bowls right arm medium pace.

References

External links
 

1992 births
English cricketers
Worcestershire cricketers
Wiltshire cricketers
Living people
Sportspeople from Bath, Somerset
English cricketers of the 21st century